WBXF-CD is a low-powered television station licensed to Des Moines, Iowa, United States. The station, which broadcasts its digital signal on virtual and UHF channel 28, is owned by L4 Media Group. The station is affiliated with The Country Network.

History 
The station’s construction permit was issued on May 10, 1989 under the calls of K04NL. It changed to WBXF-CA on June 1, 2001, and then to the current WBXF-CD on October 28, 2015.

Digital channels

References

External links

Low-power television stations in the United States
Television stations in Iowa
Television channels and stations established in 1998
1998 establishments in Iowa